Finland participated in the inaugural Paralympic Games in 1960 in Rome, with a single representative, swimmer Tauno Valkama - who won gold in his sole event, the 50m crawl. The country was absent from the 1964 Games, but returned in 1968, and has participated in every subsequent edition of the Summer Paralympics. Finland has also taken part in every edition of the Winter Paralympics, from the first in 1976.

Finland's 'awakening' to the Paralympics came in 1976, both at the inaugural Winter Games (where it finished third on the medal chart), and at the Summer Games, where it won fifty medals - forty-seven more than it had at the previous summer edition. The country performed strongly throughout the 1980s, then began to decline, in terms of both medal hauls and ranking. In 2004, Finns won only eight medals - the first time since 1972 that they had won fewer than ten. At the Winter Games, Finland was initially a major power, ranking in the top 3 until 1988, and in the top 10 until 2002, despite a gradual yet steady decline. At the 2006 Winter Games, Finland failed to win a single medal; the country won only a silver and a bronze in 2010.

Medals

Summer Paralympics

Winter Paralympics

See also
 Finland at the Olympics

References

 
Paralympics